Robert Barry Bonnell (born October 27, 1953) is an American former outfielder in Major League Baseball (MLB). After playing basketball and baseball for the Ohio State University (OSU), he played baseball for the Atlanta Braves, Toronto Blue Jays and Seattle Mariners between 1977 and 1986.

Early life
Bonnell was a star athlete at Milford High School near Cincinnati, Ohio, where he played both varsity baseball and basketball on championship teams. Following high school graduation in 1971, Bonnell attended OSU on a full athletic scholarship where he played both baseball and basketball. Bonnell left college during his senior year to play MLB. The Philadelphia Phillies made him the first overall pick in the 1975 MLB January Draft – Secondary Phase (for college players who had been previously drafted out of high school).

MLB career
During his 10-year MLB career, Bonnell played for the Atlanta Braves of the National League, and the Toronto Blue Jays and Seattle Mariners of the American League. His major league debut with the Braves was in a game against the Pittsburgh Pirates on May 4, .  

Known by his peers as a "money hitter", Bonnell hit four grand slams during his career and led his teams in game-winning hits nearly every year he played. Bonnell was known for his strong and accurate throwing arm.

Bonnell struggled to play with the affliction. It took a year to recover and he served his remaining two years as a bit player.

Personal life
Bonnell married his high school sweetheart, Stefnie Stapp. Bonnell is a devout member of the Church of Jesus Christ of Latter-day Saints, and he introduced Braves teammate, Dale Murphy, to the faith.

Bonnell pursued a career in aviation after exiting MLB during the All-Star Break in 1986. He attended Flight Safety International's Airline Transition Program and was hired as a first officer by Northwest Airlink's Express Air One. Bonnell flew the twin engine turboprop SAAB 340-B for a year but decided that with the events of the day, notably, the failure of Eastern Airlines and, for the second time, the failure of Braniff Airlines, that there were too many high time furloughed pilots flooding the system for him to have a reasonable opportunity to advance to a job flying jets for a major airline.

Bonnell left flying to enter the business world, where he worked in the home medical equipment field for ten years.  After that he became an importer, supplying a variety of items to large brick and mortar retail chains. Bonnell then became a writer. He has completed work on his personal memoirs and has published the first book in a series planned for at least three works.  Bonnell's first book, Enchanted Notions, is an urban fantasy, published in November 2015.

References

External links

Barry Bonnell 

1953 births
Living people
American expatriate baseball players in Canada
Atlanta Braves players
Baseball players from Ohio
Cardenales de Lara players
American expatriate baseball players in Venezuela
Greenwood Braves players
Latter Day Saints from Ohio
Major League Baseball outfielders
Ohio State Buckeyes baseball players
Ohio State University alumni
People from Clermont County, Ohio
People from Milford, Ohio
Richmond Braves players
Savannah Braves players
Seattle Mariners players
Spartanburg Phillies players
Sun City Rays players
Toronto Blue Jays players